Terje Steen (13 January 1944 – 1 September 2020) was a Norwegian ice hockey player. He was born in Oslo and represented the club Vålerengens IF. He played for the Norwegian national ice hockey team, and  participated at the Winter Olympics in 1968 and 1972.

References

External links

1944 births
2020 deaths
Ice hockey players at the 1968 Winter Olympics
Ice hockey players at the 1972 Winter Olympics
Norwegian ice hockey players
Olympic ice hockey players of Norway
Ice hockey people from Oslo
Vålerenga Ishockey players